Colorado City may refer to some places in the United States:

Colorado City, Arizona, in Mohave County, Arizona
Colorado City, Colorado, in Pueblo County, Colorado
Old Colorado City, district of Colorado Springs, Colorado
Colorado City, Nevada, a ghost town in Clark County, Nevada
Colorado City, Texas, in Mitchell County, Texas
Colorado City, Yuma County, Arizona, a ghost town